is railway station on the Kyūdai Main Line operated by Kyushu Railway Company in Kurume, Fukuoka Prefecture, Japan. The station name refers to the nearby Kurume High School.

Lines 
Only local trains on the line stop at the station.

Layout 
The station consists of a side platforms serving a single track. The station building is a modern concrete structure which houses a waiting room, automatic ticket vending machine, a Sugoca charge machine, a Sugoca reader and a staffed ticket window.

Management of the station has been outsourced to the JR Kyushu Tetsudou Eigyou Co., a wholly owned subsidiary of JR Kyushu specialising in station services. It staffs the ticket counter which is equipped with a POS machine but does not have a Midori no Madoguchi facility.

Adjacent stations

History
JR Kyushu opened the station on 14 March 2009 as an additional station on the existing track of the Kyudai Main Line.

Passenger statistics
In fiscal 2016, the station was used by an average of 670 passengers daily (boarding passengers only), and it ranked 209th among the busiest stations of JR Kyushu.

References

External links
Kurume-Kōkōmae (JR Kyushu)

Railway stations in Fukuoka Prefecture
Railway stations in Japan opened in 2009